John L. Parker (born ) is a politician in Ontario, Canada. He was a Progressive Conservative member of the Legislative Assembly of Ontario for York East from 1995 to 1999. From 2006 to 2014 he was a Toronto city councillor for Ward 26, which includes the neighbourhoods of Leaside and Flemingdon Park. From 2010 to 2014 he was appointed as Deputy Speaker.

Background
Parker graduated from the University of Toronto, then Osgoode Hall Law School in 1980, and worked as a lawyer. After moving to the Leaside area he became active in the community and was a founding member of the board of the Bessborough Child Care Centre. He is a member of the Leaside United Church. He has coached community baseball, soccer and hockey teams. He served on the Board of the Leaside Hockey Rink and chaired the East York Committee of Adjustment.

In 2001, Parker helped found the Ontario Association of Former Parliamentarians. The association's objectives include offering experience in support of parliamentary democracy in a non-partisan way and to foster good relations between current members. Parker serves on the Board of Directors of the Churchill Society for the Advancement of Parliamentary Democracy, a non-partisan, charitable organization that facilitates education, discussion and debate about Canada's parliamentary democracy.

Provincial politics
He was elected to the Ontario legislature in the 1995 provincial election, defeating incumbent New Democrat Gary Malkowski by 3,263 votes in the riding of York East.  He served in Mike Harris's government for the next four years. During that time he was parliamentary assistant to Native Affairs.

In 1996, the Harris government reduced the number of provincial ridings from 130 to 103. This change resulted in some sitting MPPs having to compete against one another in the 1999 provincial election. Parker ran against Liberal Mike Colle in the newly created riding of Eglinton—Lawrence, and was defeated by 11,307 votes. Colle received 56.85 percent of the popular vote compared to Parker's 29.72 percent.

Municipal politics
In 2006, Parker was elected as the City Councillor for Toronto's Ward 26. In a field of 15 candidates, Parker prevailed by a margin of 215 votes over runner-up Mohamed Dhanani. Parker received a total of 3,369 votes which amounted to just 20% of the popular vote. Parker has received low grades on environmental issues. In 2008, the Toronto Environmental Alliance issued Parker an "F" grade for what they perceived to be an egregious voting record in 2007–2008. While he is widely considered to be a right-wing councillor, Parker has received poor performance grades from the editorial boards of traditionally conservative newspapers in Ontario. The National Post and Toronto Sun gave Parker "C" grades in "report cards" these outlets issued for Toronto City Councillors in 2007 and 2010 respectively. November 21, 2011, the Toronto Sun scored Councillor Parker an "A+". On November 18, 2012, Toronto Taxpayer Coalition report card gave a rating of "B".

In 2010, Parker was re-elected in Ward 26. He tallied the most votes in a three-way race between previous contender Dhanani and newcomer Jon Burnside. The Toronto Sun supported Parker giving him the recommendation as "a hard-wired East Yorker, who brings a conservative ethic and is not easily panicked."  He was selected to be Deputy Speaker in December 2010.

On October 27, 2014, Parker was defeated by Jon Burnside during the 2014 municipal elections and was the only incumbent defeated in the 2014 elections.

Election results

Unofficial results as of October 26, 2010 03:55 am

References

External links

1954 births
Lawyers in Ontario
Living people
Members of the United Church of Canada
Progressive Conservative Party of Ontario MPPs
Osgoode Hall Law School alumni
Toronto city councillors
University of Toronto alumni